The 2007 Savannah State Tigers football team competed in American football on behalf of the Savannah State University in the 2007 NCAA Division I FCS football season as an independent.  This was the team's second season under the guidance of head coach Theo Lemon.

Schedule

Roster

Statistics

Team

Scores by quarter

Offense

Rushing

Passing

Receiving

Defense

Special teams

References

Savannah State
Savannah State Tigers football seasons
Savannah State Tigers football